Syedna AbdulHusain Husamuddin bin Syedna Tayyeb Zainuddin was the 48th Da'i al-Mutlaq of the Dawoodi Bohra. He was born on the day of Ashura (10th Muharram al-Haram) in 1239 AH/1823 AD and died on 27th Zilhijjat al-Haram 1308 AH/1891 AD in Ahmedabad, India.

He succeeded his brother, the 47th Da'i, Syedna AbdulQadir Najmuddin, to the religious post. Syedna Husamuddin became Da'i al-Mutlaq in 1302 AH/1885 AD. His period of Dawat was 1302–1308 AH/1885–1891 AD. Syedna Abdul Husain Husamuddin appointed or gave nass to Syedna Mohammad Burhanuddin (49th Dai) as his successor.

References

Further reading
The Ismaili, their history and doctrine by Farhad Daftary (Chapter -Mustalian Ismailism- p. 300-310)

Dawoodi Bohra da'is
1891 deaths
Year of birth missing
19th-century Ismailis